Betpouey is a commune in the Hautes-Pyrénées department in southwestern France.

Geography
The Petite Baïse forms part of the commune's southwestern border, then flows north through the middle of the commune.

Population

See also
Communes of the Hautes-Pyrénées department

References

Communes of Hautes-Pyrénées